This is a list of nominated candidates for the Animal Alliance Environment Voters Party of Canada in the 2011 Canadian federal election.

Ontario - 6 seats

Northwest Territories - 1 seat

References

External links
 Animal Alliance Environmental Voters Party of Canada website
 Elections Canada – List of Confirmed Candidates for the 41st General Election

Candidates in the 2011 Canadian federal election